The Diocese of Bisaccia (Latin: Dioecesis Bisaciensis) in the town of Bisaccia in the province of Avellino, in southern Italy. In 1517, it was united with the Diocese of Sant'Angelo dei Lombardi.

Ordinaries
(all Roman Rite; probably incomplete)

Diocese of Bisaccia
Erected: 12th Century 

 Basilio (1097? – ?)
 Riccardo (1179? – ?)
 Lodato (1254.09.30 – ?)
 Zaccaria (1265 – death 1282)
 Benedetto (1282 – 1288.04.20), later Bishop of Avellino (Italy) (1288.04.20 – death 1294)
 Giacomo (1311.05.19 – death 1328), previously Bishop of La Canea (Greece; ? – 1311.05.19)
 Bestagno, Dominican Order O.P. (1329.09.11 – 1351)
 Nicola, O.P. (1351.06.27 – ?)
 Benedetto Colonna (1353 – ?)
 Giovanni (? – 1364.07.23), later Bishop of Terralba (Italy) (1364.07.23 – 1389)
 Costantino da Termoli, Augustinians (O.E.S.A.) (1365.03.26 – 1368.11.03), later Bishop of Montecorvino (1368.11.03 – ?)
 Stefano (1368 – 1369)
 Francesco de Capite, Friars Minor (O.F.M.) (1369.02.21 – ?)
 Nicola (1386.06.09 – ?)
 Leone (1389.08.21 – ?)
 Giovanni Angeli (1410.06.13 – )
 Guglielmo Nicolai (1428.11.03 – ?)
 Petruccio de Migliolo (1450.06.12 – 1463.01.30), later Bishop of Lacedonia (Italy) (1463.01.30 – death 1481)
 Martino Madio da Tramonti (Madio da Tramonti) (1463.04.08 – 1487.08.24), later Bishop of Bisceglie (Italy) (1487.08.24 – 1507)
 Bernardino Barbiani (1487.08.24 – ?), previously Bishop of Bisceglie (Italy) (1476.08.09 – 1487.08.24)
 Gaspare de Corbara (1498.11.12 – 1517.12.23)
 Nicola Volpe (1517.12.23 – death 1540)

23 December 1517: United with the Diocese of Sant'Angelo dei Lombardi to form the Diocese of Sant'Angelo dei Lombardi e Bisaccia

See also
Catholic Church in Italy

References

Former Roman Catholic dioceses in Europe